Keep Moving may refer to:
Keep Moving (Madness album), 1984
Keep Moving (Novi Split album), 2004
Keep Moving (Andrew Stockdale album), 2013
Keep Moving (EP), an EP by Andrew Stockdale
Keep Moving (song), a song by Adam Deacon and Bashy, featuring Paloma Faith
"Keep Movin", a 1963 single by Sounds Incorporated
"Keep Moving", a song by Ivy from the album In the Clear
Keep Moving Tour, a cancelled concert tour by Andrew Stockdale